Sarn was a municipality in the district of Hinterrhein in the Swiss canton of Graubünden.  On 1 January 2010 the municipalities of Portein, Präz, Sarn, and Tartar merged into the municipality of Cazis.

History
Sarn is first mentioned in 1156 as Sarn.

Geography
Of this area, 78.9% is used for agricultural purposes, while 15.1% is forested. Of the rest of the land, 3.2% is settled (buildings or roads) and the remainder (2.8%) is non-productive (rivers, glaciers or mountains).

The municipality is located in the Thusis sub-district, of the Hinterrhein district.  It consists of the haufendorf (an irregular, unplanned and quite closely packed village, built around a central square) village of Sarn on the Heinzenberg mountains.  The municipalities of Portein, Präz, Sarn, and Tartar merged on 1 January 2010 into the municipality of Cazis.

Demographics
Sarn has a population of 142, of which 8.5% are foreign nationals.  Over the last 10 years the population has decreased at a rate of -15.5%.

, the gender distribution of the population was 51.4% male and 48.6% female.  The age distribution, in Sarn is; 27 people or 17.0% of the population are between 0 and 9 years old.  14 people or 8.8% are 10 to 14, and 9 people or 5.7% are 15 to 19.  Of the adult population, 8 people or 5.0% of the population are between 20 and 29 years old.  25 people or 15.7% are 30 to 39, 26 people or 16.4% are 40 to 49, and 16 people or 10.1% are 50 to 59.  The senior population distribution is 18 people or 11.3% of the population are between 60 and 69 years old, 14 people or 8.8% are 70 to 79, there are 2 people or 1.3% who are 80 to 89.

In the 2007 federal election the most popular party was the SVP which received 51.5% of the vote.  The next three most popular parties were the FDP (18.1%), the FDP (18.1%) and the CVP (11.7%).

The entire Swiss population is generally well educated.  In Sarn about 71% of the population (between age 25-64) have completed either non-mandatory upper secondary education or additional higher education (either University or a Fachhochschule).

Sarn has an unemployment rate of 0%.  , there were 39 people employed in the primary economic sector and about 12 businesses involved in this sector.  10 people are employed in the secondary sector and there is 1 business in this sector.  7 people are employed in the tertiary sector, with 6 businesses in this sector.

The historical population is given in the following table:

Languages
Most of the population speaks German (97.5%), with Italian being second most common ( 1.9%) and English being third ( 0.6%).

References

External links

 Official Web site

Cazis
Former municipalities of Graubünden
Populated places disestablished in 2010
2010 disestablishments in Switzerland